Leena Hämet-Ahti (née Hämet, b. 3 January 1931, Kuusamo) is a Finnish botanist, plant taxonomist, and plant collector noted for being Associate Professor of Botany at the University of Helsinki, and later the Director of the university's Botanical Garden.  She primarily studies alpine plants of Finland and similar northern hemisphere climates. Her PhD thesis, defended in 1963, was on mountain birch forests. She participated in the production of the seminal Finnish floras Retkeilykasvio (1984, 1998) and Suomen puu- ja pensaskasvio (1992).

Hämet-Ahti won the  Finnish Cultural Foundation prize in 1990  and the  silver Kairamo medal in 2007 "in recognition of her many merits in botany, university teaching, science popularisation and fostering Finnish cultural heritage".

Hämet-Ahti has been a member of the Finnish Academy of Science and Letters since 1991. She is married to botanist and lichenologist Teuvo Ahti.

References 

 1931 births
 Finnish women scientists
20th-century Finnish botanists
Living people
21st-century Finnish botanists